The XXX Corps (30 Corps), known as Triple X Corps, is a corps of the Pakistan Army currently assigned to Gujranwala, Punjab Province. The Corps is a major and integral part of the army, along with PAF's Eastern Air Command. It is currently commanded by Lt Gen Muhammad Aamir

The vital area, which connects Pakistan's Punjab with parts of the Indian union territory of Jammu and Kashmir (extending from Jehlum to Narowal), has always been of strategic importance; the place was the site of major battles in both 1965 and 1971. Traditionally, this area had been held by I Corps. That corps already had offensive duties, and the task of defending this area was being neglected by the corps HQ.

To improve the situation, it was decided to raise another corps headquarters to look after this area. Thus the XXX Corps was raised and given the command of both new raisings and units and formations detached from I Corps, which was then dedicated to offensive tasks.

Since the beginnings of an anti-India insurgency in Kashmir, the Line of Control has been an active operational zone. The corps has been deployed along its sector of the LOC and engaged in operations since 1989.

Structure
Its present order of battle is as follows:

List of Commanders

References

Corps of the Pakistan Army
Military units and formations established in 1987
1987 establishments in Pakistan Pakistan is a best in the world